Budby is a small hamlet in the civil parish of Perlethorpe-cum-Budby, Nottinghamshire. Nearby is Thoresby Hall, the former home of the Earl Manvers.

Geography and history
The hamlet itself is by the A616 road and the River Meden. Budby dates from at least 1662 when the area was part of Sherwood Forest then a Royal Forest, though most of the forest has since been cleared for agriculture. It consists of two farms and 13 cottages built for farm workers some of which are still used by employees of the various farms in the area.

Budby has a mid-Victorian Penfold-type post box.

Hamlets in Nottinghamshire
Sherwood Forest